The following are the telephone codes in Comoros.

Country Code: +269
International Call Prefix: 00
Trunk Prefix: none

Calling formats
To call in the Comoros, the following format is used: 
 yyy xxxx - Calls inside the Comoros
 +269 yyy xxxx - Calls from outside the Comoros
The NSN length is seven digits.

List of telephone prefixes in the Comoros
The two tables below show the geographical and non-geographical telephone prefixes in the Comoros as announced by the Comorian regulatory body, Autorité Nationale de Régulation des Technologies de l'Information et de la Communication (ANRTIC), on the International Telecommunication Union (ITU) website:

References

Comoros
Telecommunications in the Comoros
Telephone numbers